"Inflatable" is the seventh episode of the second season of the American television crime drama series Better Call Saul, a spin-off series of Breaking Bad. Written by Gordon Smith and directed by Colin Bucksey, the episode aired on AMC in the United States on March 28, 2016. Outside of the United States, the episode premiered on the streaming service Netflix in several countries.

Plot

Opening
In a flashback to 1973, Jimmy McGill is working in his father's store when a grifter enters and attempts to pull a con by telling Jimmy's father he has a young child and is in financial need. Jimmy disbelieves the grifter and tries to warn his father, but his father is more concerned that suspicion could cause him to turn away someone who really requires help. While Jimmy's father is distracted, the grifter admits the con and tells Jimmy there are only wolves and sheep in the world, and he will have to choose which to be. Disillusioned by his father's gullibility, Jimmy steals money from the register.

Main story
Jimmy represents Mike Ehrmantraut when Mike tells the prosecutor that the gun found after the fight between Mike and Tuco Salamanca was not Tuco's. Jimmy decides to quit D&M but learns that if he quits, he will have to repay the signing bonus he received when he joined. Jimmy finds a loophole in his contract which permits him to keep the money if he is fired without cause. While waiting at a stop light, he sees an inflatable tube man outside an oil-changing shop. Inspired by the colorful display, he executes a plan to get fired by doing everything he can think of to be irritating at work, from dressing in flashy suits to playing bagpipes in his office to not flushing the toilet after trips to the bathroom. Clifford Main finally fires Jimmy and tells him losing the signing bonus is worth it just to be rid of him.

Jimmy approaches Kim Wexler and attempts to convince her to partner with him in their own law firm. Kim agrees, but only on the condition that Jimmy plays it "straight and narrow". Jimmy admits that he can only be himself, which means pushing the envelope on what is legal and ethical, so Kim politely refuses. Jimmy then moves back to his old office at the nail salon.

Mike promises to buy Stacey Ehrmantraut a new house in a better neighborhood and begins scouting Hector Salamanca's restaurant. Kim proposes a compromise to Jimmy, suggesting they start separate solo firms, but share office space to save on expenses and support each other if needed. Jimmy considers her offer and does not immediately respond.

Production
The episode features Stephen Snedden as the grifter during the flashback. Snedden was previously a starring cast member of The Lone Gunmen, a spin-off of The X-Files that Better Call Saul co-creator Vince Gilligan wrote and developed. He would also appear in The X-Files episode "Jump the Shark", also co-written by Gilligan, to resolve some of the hanging plotlines of The Lone Gunmen after the series was cancelled.

Reception

Ratings
Upon airing, the episode received 2.03 million American viewers, and an 18–49 rating of 0.8.

Critical reception
The episode received very positive reviews from critics. It holds a perfect 100% positive rating with an average score of 8.88 out of 10 on the review aggregator site Rotten Tomatoes. The critics' consensus reads: "Rich in character (and colorful suits), "Inflatable" is a funny and profound turning point for several key figures with life-altering decisions to be made."

Terri Schwartz of IGN gave the episode a 9.3 rating, writing: "Jimmy decides to set out on his own solo path – but Kim isn't willing to fully walk it with them."

References

External links
 "Inflatable" at AMC
 

Better Call Saul (season 2) episodes